Rubus parviflorus, commonly called thimbleberry, (also known as redcaps) is a species of Rubus native to northern temperate regions of North America. The plant has large hairy leaves and no thorns. It bears edible red fruit similar in appearance to a raspberry, but shorter, almost hemispherical. It has not been commercially developed for the retail berry market, but is cultivated for landscapes.

Description 

Unlike many other members of the genus, it has no prickles.

The flower of this species is among the largest of any Rubus species.

Like raspberries, it is not a true berry, but instead an aggregate fruit of numerous drupelets around a central core. The drupelets may be carefully removed intact, separately from the core, when picked, leaving a hollow fruit which bears a resemblance to a thimble, perhaps giving the plant its name.

Etymology 
The specific epithet parviflorus ("small-flowered") is a misnomer, since the species' flower is the largest of the genus. The Concow tribe calls the plant wä-sā’ (Konkow language).

Distribution and habitat 
Rubus parviflorus is native to western North America from Alaska south as far as California, New Mexico, Chihuahua, and San Luis Potosí. Its range extends east to the Rocky Mountains and discontinuously to the Great Lakes Region.

R. parviflorus typically grows along roadsides, railroad tracks, and in forest clearings, commonly appearing as an early part of the ecological succession in clear cut and forest fire areas.

Thimbleberry is found in forest understories with typical flora associates including coastal woodfern (Dryopteris arguta), Trillium ovatum and Smilacina racemosa.

Ecology
The fruit is consumed by birds and bears, while black-tailed deer browse the young leaves and stems. Larvae of the wasp species Diastrophus kincaidii (thimbleberry gallmaker) develop in large, swollen galls on R. parviflorus stems.

Cultivation

R. parviflorus is cultivated by specialty plant nurseries as an ornamental plant, used in traditional, native plant, and wildlife gardens, in natural landscaping design, and in habitat restoration projects. The fruit has fragrance. Thimbleberry plants can be propagated most successfully by planting dormant rhizome segments, as well as from seeds or stem cuttings.

The flowers support pollinators, including of special value to Native bees, honeybees, and bumblebees. The fruit is attractive to various birds and mammals, including bears. It is the larval host and a nectar source for the yellow-banded sphinx moth.

Cultivars
Cultivars of the plant are selected for ornamental qualities, such as for their fragrant flowers and/or attractive fall foliage color.

A double-flowered form of the thimbleberry was discovered near Squamish, British Columbia, by Iva Angerman (1903–2008) of West Vancouver. This clone does not appear to be in commerce, but is grown in the Botanic Garden of the University of British Columbia, Vancouver, and in the Native Plant Garden of the Royal British Columbia Museum, Victoria.

Uses

Cuisine
Thimbleberry fruits are flatter and softer (more fragile) than raspberries, but similarly have many small seeds. Because the fruit is so soft, it does not pack or ship well, so thimbleberries are rarely cultivated commercially.

Wild thimbleberries can be eaten raw or dried (the water content of ripe thimbleberries is quite variable), and can be made into a jam which is sold as a local delicacy in some parts of their range, notably in the Keweenaw Peninsula of Upper Michigan. Thimbleberry jam is commonly made by combining equal volumes of berries and sugar and boiling the mixture for two minutes before packing it into jars. Without sugar, the cooked berries, with a distinguishing sweet-sour taste, keep for a few days in the refrigerator.

Traditional medicine
Many parts of the plant were used in folk medicine by Native Americans. A tea made from its leaves or roots was thought to be a treatment for wounds, burns, acne, or digestive problems; a tea made from the canes was thought to be useful as a diuretic. As of 2019, there is no evidence from modern clinical research or practice that R. parviflorus is effective for treating any disease.

Thimbleberry leaves can be used in place of toilet paper when in the wilderness.

References

External links

 
 
 

parviflorus
Berries
Flora of North America
Flora of the Western United States
Canadian cuisine
Cuisine of Michigan
Bird food plants
Butterfly food plants
Garden plants of North America
Plants described in 1818